Novoabzanovo (Yañı Abzan) is a rural locality (a village) in Kucherbayevsky Selsoviet, Blagovarsky District, Bashkortostan, Russia. The population was 132 as of 2010. There is 1 street.

Geography 
Novoabzanovo is located 40 km northwest of Yazykovo (the district's administrative centre) by road. Chulpan 2-y is the nearest rural locality.

References 

Rural localities in Blagovarsky District